Mount Martha Black, elevation , is the highest point in the Auriol Range of the Saint Elias Mountains in Yukon, Canada. Set within Kluane National Park, Mount Martha Black can be seen from the Alaska Highway, weather permitting. The mountain was named after Martha Black (1866-1957), the second woman elected to the House of Commons of Canada. The mountain's name was officially adopted August 12, 1980, by the Geographical Names Board of Canada.

Climate

Based on the Köppen climate classification, Mount Martha Black is located in a subarctic climate zone with long, cold, snowy winters, and mild summers.  The annual average temperature in the neighborhood is -6 ° C. The warmest month is July, when the average temperature is 8 °C, and the coldest is December when temperatures can drop below −20 °C with wind chill factors below −30 °C. Precipitation runoff from the peak and meltwater from its surrounding glaciers drains into tributaries of the Alsek River.

See also

List of mountains of Canada
Geography of Yukon

References

External links
 Weather forecast: Mount Martha Black
 Parks Canada: Kluane National Park
 Mt. Martha Black photo: Flickr

Two-thousanders of Yukon
Saint Elias Mountains
Kluane National Park and Reserve